Erik Holmgren (born 17 December 1964) is a retired football defender.

During his club career, Holmgren played for HJK Helsinki, GAIS, FinnPa, Pallokerho-35 and FC Jokerit. He made 60 appearances for the Finland national team, scoring 2 goals.

External links

1964 births
Living people
Finnish footballers
People from Porvoo
Finnish expatriate footballers
Finland international footballers
Association football defenders
Veikkausliiga players
Allsvenskan players
Helsingin Jalkapalloklubi players
GAIS players
FinnPa players
FC Jokerit players
Expatriate footballers in Sweden
Sportspeople from Uusimaa